The Billy Goat Tavern is a chain of taverns located in Chicago, Illinois.  Its restaurants are based on the original Billy Goat Tavern founded in 1934 by Billy Sianis, a Greek immigrant. It achieved fame primarily through newspaper columns by Mike Royko, a supposed curse on the Chicago Cubs, and the Olympia Cafe sketch on Saturday Night Live.

The tavern has eight locations with seven in Chicago, including the oldest extant location on Lower Michigan Avenue, Navy Pier, the Merchandise Mart, O'Hare Airport, Midway Airport, on Lake Street ( block west of Michigan Avenue), and in the West Loop on Madison Street (near the United Center); and one location in the suburban Yorktown Mall in Lombard, Illinois. They expanded to Washington, D.C. in 2005, the first location outside the Chicago metropolitan area; it is intended to appeal primarily to Chicago transplants, as well as students from the Georgetown University Law Center located across the street.

History

The first location, at 1855 W. Madison St., was opened in 1934 when William "Billy Goat" Sianis bought the Lincoln Tavern, near Chicago Stadium, for $205 with a bounced check (the proceeds from the first weekend they were open were used to fulfill the payment).  When the 1944 Republican National Convention came to town, he posted a sign saying "No Republicans allowed," causing the place to be packed with Republicans demanding service.  This resulted in publicity, which Sianis used to his advantage.

In 1964, the original tavern moved to 430 N. Michigan Ave., which is actually below Michigan Avenue, made possible by Chicago's network of multilevel streets in that vicinity. Being situated between the offices of the Chicago Tribune and the old Chicago Sun-Times building led to the tavern's mention in several regular newspaper columns, particularly those of Mike Royko.

In 1970, Sianis petitioned then mayor of Chicago Richard J. Daley to issue him the first liquor license for the moon.  His hope, according to the comedic letter that currently adorns the establishment's wall, was to best serve his country by serving delicious cheeseburgers to wayfaring astronauts as well as raising moon-goats. Sianis died in October 1970.

On New Year's Eve 2005, the tavern held a farewell party for the City News Service, successor to the City News Bureau of Chicago, whose reporters were a fixture at the Billy Goat for decades. A small sign commemorating America's first news agency still hangs near the northwest wall.

In 2010, Illinois's Republican junior U.S. Senator-elect Representative Mark Kirk met with his defeated Democratic opponent, Alexi Giannoulias, for 20 minutes at the Chicago tavern following the bitter campaign and a tight election, where both sides had made each other's missteps very public.

Cubs curse

The tavern is also known for its involvement in the Curse of the Billy Goat (also known as the "Cubs Curse"). Owner Sianis brought his pet goat, a tavern mascot, to Game 4 of the 1945 World Series, a home game at Wrigley Field against the Detroit Tigers. Despite paid-for box seat tickets, Cubs owner Philip K. Wrigley allegedly ejected Sianis and goat due to the latter's odor. Supposedly, Sianis placed a curse on the team that after this year there will never be another World Series game played at Wrigley Field. After an extensive dry spell, they eventually won the 2016 National League Championship Series against the Los Angeles Dodgers.

Olympia Café

Another sign reads: "Cheezborger, Cheezborger, Cheezborger. No Pepsi. Coke," These words, with Pepsi and Coke in reverse order, were originally popularized by John Belushi in "Olympia Cafe," an early Saturday Night Live sketch that was inspired by the tavern.
Bill Murray and sketch writer (and bit player) Don Novello were regulars at the Billy Goat; Belushi and Murray were natives of the Chicago area, and Novello had moved to Chicago in the 1960s.

See also
 List of hamburger restaurants

References

Further reading

External links 

 
Video of Billy Goat Tavern in D.C.

1934 establishments in Illinois
Greek-American culture in Chicago
History of Chicago
Restaurants in Chicago
Drinking establishments in Chicago
Chicago Cubs
Restaurants established in 1934